Collin Patrick Green (born 1962) is a vice admiral in the United States Navy who serves as the deputy commander of the United States Special Operations Command since December 16, 2021. He most recently served as Chief of Staff of the United States Special Operations Command. He graduated and was commissioned from the United States Naval Academy in 1986. Green also holds degrees from the Catholic University of America and United States Naval War College. He is a naval special warfare officer and previously served as commander of United States Special Operations Command South from 2016 to June 2018. 

Green relinquished command of Naval Special Warfare Command in September 2020, before transitioning to the Chief of Staff position at the United States Special Operations Command in Tampa, Florida. 

Green was born and raised in Bowie, Maryland, one of nine children. His father, Leo E. Green, is a former Maryland state senator and mayor of Bowie. He is married and has four children.

In October 2021, he was nominated for promotion to vice admiral and assignment as the deputy commander of the United States Special Operations Command, succeeding Timothy Szymanski, being confirmed in December of the same year.

References

1962 births
Living people
People from Bowie, Maryland
United States Naval Academy alumni
United States Navy SEALs personnel
Catholic University of America alumni
United States Navy personnel of the Gulf War
Naval War College alumni
United States Navy personnel of the Iraq War
United States Navy personnel of the War in Afghanistan (2001–2021)
Recipients of the Legion of Merit
United States Navy rear admirals
Recipients of the Defense Superior Service Medal